Geuvânio Santos Silva (born 5 April 1992), simply known as Geuvânio, is a Brazilian professional footballer who plays as a forward for Ituano FC.

Club career

Santos
Born in Ilha das Flores, Sergipe, Geuvânio appeared the most of his youth career with Santos' youth system, but also  appeared with some lower clubs in the process. On 6 June 2012 he made his first-team – and Série A – debut, coming on as a late substitute in a 1–1 home draw against Fluminense.

On 1 August, after being sparingly used, Geuvânio almost rescinded his link with Santos and joined Académica de Coimbra. However, the deal fell through a day later.

On 19 January 2013 Geuvânio was loaned to Penapolense until the end of 2013 Campeonato Paulista. As a loanee he scored his first professional goal, the last of a 3–0 home win over São Bernardo on 23 March.

Geuvânio returned to Santos in June, and was a regular starter during the end of the 2013 season. He retained his status for the 2014 campaign, under new manager Oswaldo de Oliveira.

Geuvânio netted his first goal for Peixe on 1 February 2014, the first of a 5–1 home routing over Botafogo-SP. Late in the month, after scoring braces against Comercial-SP and Bragantino, he signed a new deal with the club, running until 2017.

Geuvânio scored his first goal in the main category of Brazilian football on 22 May 2014, netting the first in a 2–2 draw at Goiás. He finished the year with 14 goals, seven behind Gabriel.

Geuvânio started the 2015 campaign with a brace in a 3–0 home success over Ituano. He repeated the fate in the last game of the year, a 5–1 home routing of Atlético Paranaense.

Tianjin Quanjian
On 20 January 2016, Geuvânio was sold to China League One side Tianjin Quanjian for a fee of €11 million, joining compatriots Luís Fabiano, Jadson and Vanderlei Luxemburgo.

Flamengo (loan)
On 21 June 2017 Flamengo signed Geuvânio on loan until the end of 2018 season.

Atlético Mineiro
On 8 March 2019, after being released from his contract with Tianjin Quanjian, Geuvânio joined Atlético Mineiro on a year-long deal which included an optional renewal clause.

Athletico Paranaense
On 16 June 2020, after nearly six months without a club, Geuvânio agreed to a 18-month deal with Athletico Paranaense still in the top tier.

Chapecoense
On 17 March 2021, Geuvânio was announced at Chapecoense, newly promoted to the top tier.

Career statistics

Honours

Club
Santos
Campeonato Paulista: 2015

Tianjin Quanjian
China League One: 2016

Individual
Campeonato Paulista Team of the year: 2014
Campeonato Paulista Best attacking midfielder: 2014
Campeonato Paulista Best newcomer: 2014

References

External links
 

1992 births
Living people
Brazilian footballers
Brazilian expatriate footballers
Sportspeople from Sergipe
Association football forwards
Campeonato Brasileiro Série A players
Santos FC players
Clube Atlético Penapolense players
CR Flamengo footballers
Clube Atlético Mineiro players
Club Athletico Paranaense players
Associação Chapecoense de Futebol players
Chinese Super League players
China League One players
Tianjin Tianhai F.C. players
Clube Náutico Capibaribe players
Ituano FC players
Brazilian expatriate sportspeople in China
Expatriate footballers in China